XHCTS-FM is a radio station on 95.7 FM in Comitán de Domínguez, Chiapas. It is owned by Radio Cañón and carries the Exa FM pop format from MVS Radio.

History
XHCTS received its concession on August 8, 1990, owned by Ismael de Jesús Delfín Cristiani. It was sold to the current concessionaire in 2000.

References

Radio stations in Chiapas